CSIO may refer to:

 Central Scientific Instruments Organisation, an Indian national laboratory dedicated to research, design and development of scientific and industrial instruments
 Centre for Study of Insurance Operations, the Canadian property and casualty insurance industry's nonprofit association of insurers, brokers and software providers
 Concours de Saut International Officiel, a ranking system for the equestrian competition show jumping
 Chief Science Information Officer, is a research executive within a healthcare organization generally responsible for the research informatics platform.